John Paul Nickell (December 28, 1915 – May 17, 2000) was an American television director.

Nickell was born in Salt Lick, Kentucky. He attended Morehead State University and the University of North Carolina. He started working in television on WPTZ in Philadelphia, moving to New York in 1948 to direct the anthology drama series Studio One. Nickell's other directing credits include Mr. Lucky, The Eleventh Hour, Ben Casey, The Virginian, Naked City, Wide Country, The Donna Reed Show, Sam Benedict, 77 Sunset Strip, The Young Marrieds and Bonanza. 

In 1964, Nickell was nominated for a Primetime Emmy Award in the category Outstanding Directing for a Comedy Series for his work on the television series The Farmer's Daughter, sharing the nomination with William D. Russell and Don Taylor. He retired from directing in 1968, and then taught at the University of North Carolina.

Nickell died in May 2000 in Raleigh, North Carolina, at the age of 84.

References

External links 

1915 births
2000 deaths
People from Bath County, Kentucky
American television directors